Kaunas University of Technology Men's Basketball Team is a professional basketball team that represents the Kaunas University of Technology, it is based in Kaunas, Lithuania and currently competes in National Basketball League.

Club achievements 
 2015-2016 season: RKL 1st place

Team roster

References 

Kaunas
Sport in Kaunas
Basketball teams established in 1994
1994 establishments in Lithuania
National Basketball League (Lithuania) teams